Chaloupky is a municipality and village in Beroun District in the Central Bohemian Region of the Czech Republic. It has about 500 inhabitants.

Administrative parts
The village of Neřežín is an administrative part of Chaloupky.

Geography
It lies in the Brdy Highlands. The Záskalská Reservoir, built on the Červený Stream, is located in the municipality.

History
The first written mention of Chaloupky is from 1648.

Sights
Near Neřežín there is the ruin of the Valdek Castle. It was built in the 13th century and once owned by King Wenceslaus IV of Bohemia. In 1623, it was described as desolated. Today the castle is in a state of disrepair and inaccessible.

Gallery

References

External links

Villages in the Beroun District